M-16 is the tenth studio album by German thrash metal band Sodom, released on 22 October 2001 by Steamhammer Records. The album is a concept album about the Vietnam War and is named after the rifle used by many U.S. soldiers during the war.

Track listing

The digipak edition contains two tracks taken from the 1982 Witching Metal demo recording.

The intro sample in "Napalm in the Morning" is taken from the film Apocalypse Now. The sample in "Marines" is taken from Full Metal Jacket.

Personnel
Sodom
 Tom Angelripper – bass, vocals
 Bernd "Bernemann" Kost – guitars
 Bobby Schottkowski – drums

Production
Axel Hermann – cover art
Harris Johns – co-producer, mixing, recording
Manfred Eisenblatter – photography

Charts

References 

Sodom (band) albums
2001 albums
Concept albums
Vietnam War in popular culture
SPV/Steamhammer albums
Albums produced by Harris Johns